Reginald Lisowski (July 11, 1926 – October 22, 2005) was an American professional wrestler, better known by his ring name, The Crusher (sometimes Crusher Lisowski to distinguish him from other Crushers, such as Crusher Blackwell). In his obituary, The Washington Post described him as "a professional wrestler whose blue-collar bona fides made him beloved among working class fans for 40 years". One of the biggest-drawing performers in the history of the American Wrestling Association (AWA), he was known as "The Wrestler Who Made Milwaukee Famous", and found his greatest success in the American Midwest, often teaming with Dick the Bruiser.

Early life 
Lisowski was born on July 11, 1926, and was raised by a Polish family in the Milwaukee suburb of South Milwaukee. Early on, he was more interested in football, playing fullback for the South Milwaukee High School football team, but took up wrestling while stationed in Germany with the United States Army. He reportedly began his training for professional wrestling at the age of 13.

Professional wrestling career

Early career 
Having developed a liking for professional wrestling, Lisowski continued training with Ivan Racy and Buck Tassie at Milwaukee's Eagles Club when he returned, eventually wrestling Marcel Buchet in his first recorded match late in 1949 as a dark-haired babyface who wore a star-spangled jacket. His early career included wrestling three to four nights per week at a Chicago armory, typically earning $5 a night. To support himself and to stay in shape, Lisowski worked various blue collar jobs by day, from meat packing to bricklaying. Fred Kohler was the first promoter to put him on TV, and by 1954 he had developed a barrel-chested physique that would stick with him for the entirety of his career. Decades before Stone Cold Steve Austin and The Sandman, Lisowski perfected the gimmick of the beer drinking tough guy. To elevate his career further, he bleached his dark hair blonde and started to get over as a strongman heel, famous for his bolo punch finisher as well as a devastating full nelson. This eventually led to him winning the Chicago-area NWA World Tag Team Championship with partner Art Nielson.

Tag team wrestling 
Lisowski continued to have tag team success throughout the remainder of the 1950s, often paired with his wrestling "brother" Stan Lisowski. By 1959, he was being billed as "Crusher" Lisowski, which legend came from a promoter's off-hand comment that he "just crushes everybody." Until early 1965, Crusher was a heel in the AWA. After meeting the team of Larry Hennig & Harley Race for the first time, the fans adopted Crusher and his wrestling "cousin" Dick the Bruiser as full-fledged heroes in AWA territory. They were sometimes known as "The Cussin' Cousins" and "saloon goons" (a nickname provided by Nick Bockwinkel). His bluster was legendary, as he would threaten to maul opponents in the ring and afterward "have a party, take all the dollies down Wisconsin Avenue, drink beer and dance the polka." Besides his impressive physique, The Crusher's gimmick was to absorb a tremendous amount of punishment and still be able to make a comeback for the win. Over the next 15 to 20 years, Crusher and Bruiser were tag partners off and on, and a natural combination due to their common background and brawling wrestling style. Both of them were steel cage specialists, rarely losing matches of that type. If Dick the Bruiser and Crusher felt they hadn't bloodied their opponents enough during a match, they would trade punches with each other afterwards. They won the AWA World Tag Team Championship 5 times, the WWA Tag Team Titles (which were from Bruiser's promotion) 6 times, and the NWA International Tag Titles 1 time among others.

Success as a solo wrestler 

Introduced at the beginning of wrestling matches as "The Wrestler That Made Milwaukee Famous" (a play on the slogan for Schlitz, "The Beer That Made Milwaukee Famous"), Crusher was successful as a solo wrestler, winning the AWA World Heavyweight Championship three times, the first time unifying it with the Omaha version of the World Heavyweight Championship on July 9, 1963, in a match where he defeated Verne Gagne. He was skillful at cutting promos, as he would brag about his "100 megaton biceps" and offer to pummel "da bum" he was facing in the ring with ease, and he often delighted in calling opponents "turkeynecks." His most quotable and famous phrase though was: "How 'bout 'dat?" When asked how he trained for a match, he'd claim he ran along the waterfront in Milwaukee carrying a large full beer barrel over either shoulder for strength (and longtime AWA announcer Rodger Kent often noted that by the end of the Crusher's training run, the beer was gone), and that he'd dance polka all night with Polish barmaids to increase his stamina. Although much of Crusher's popularity came from the idea that he was a big beer drinker, in actuality, he never drank beer, and according to Baron Von Raschke, he actually preferred wine. In 1981, Lisowski's wrestling career almost came to an end when the 450-pound Jerry Blackwell (who he had feuded with over the "Crusher" moniker) botched a top rope move and landed on Lisowski's right arm, causing nerve damage from his shoulder all the way to his wrist. Doctors told him he would never wrestle again, but Crusher did strength training for two years while he was unofficially "retired," returning to the ring in 1983, teaming with Baron von Raschke to beat Jerry Blackwell and Ken Patera for the AWA World Tag Team titles, only to lose them to The Road Warriors in August 1984.

Move to the World Wrestling Federation 

Lisowski also had a successful run in the WWF in the early 1960s, where he was the nemesis of Johnny Valentine and a young Bruno Sammartino, primarily in the Pittsburgh promotion. In the mid-1980s, seeing that the American Wrestling Association (AWA) promotion with which he had the most success over the years was crumbling, particularly when Hulk Hogan and many of the other top talent jumped ship to Vince McMahon's World Wrestling Federation (WWF), Crusher went to work for McMahon on a part-time basis, appearing at WWF house shows all over the Midwest. Lisowski claimed that he made more money working part-time for McMahon than he did working for the frugal Gagne on a full-time basis. In 1986, Lisowski occasionally teamed with The Machines as Crusher Machine.

The Crusher's last recorded match was at a WWF house show in Omaha on February 15, 1988, replacing Billy Jack Haynes to team with Ken Patera and face Demolition, who were disqualified when Mr. Fuji tripped Crusher with a cane about three minutes in. The Crusher's last television appearance was at WWF's 1998 pay-per-view Over the Edge: In Your House where was shown sitting alongside Mad Dog Vachon in the front row. Jerry Lawler made fun of the two men's age, and tried to steal Vachon's artificial leg, but Vachon hit him over the head with it, and Crusher punched him. As Lawler bailed, the two former enemies shook hands.

Other media 
In 1974, he and Dick the Bruiser starred in the movie The Wrestler, where they beat up a posse of mobsters on the big screen. Lisowski also pitched products in commercials for liquor stores and televisions. He starred in a Byron’s Tires commercial where he folded a casing in half and yelled “Don’t be a turkey neck! Get your tires from Byron’s!”.

Personal life and death 
Lisowski once worked as a guest conductor for the Milwaukee Symphony Orchestra at a fundraising event.

In his later years, multiple surgeries on his hips and his knee crippled Lisowski, as well as heart bypass surgery and a non-cancerous tumor removed from his brain stem in March 2005, which left him partially paralyzed. Lisowski's wife Faye died in March 2003 after the couple were married for 55 years. He spent the final months of his life in a nursing home and had to be fed through a tube, but his son David stated that he would never stop working out until his death.

On October 22, 2005, he died of a brain tumor at the age of 79. He, his wife, Faye, and infant son Gary are interred at the Holy Sepulcher Cemetery near Milwaukee. At his burial, a wrestling ring with crimson ropes was set up, and on the mat were a pair of black wrestling boots. He was survived by four children, nine grandchildren and one great-granddaughter. Gagne reacted to his death by saying to the St. Paul Pioneer Press, "We had some dandy matches. The Crusher never was a great technically skilled wrestler, but he was tougher than nails and a brawler. He could bench press nearly 600 pounds. And he loved to have fun. After a match, he couldn't get a beer in his hands fast enough."

Legacy 
In 1964, the Minneapolis-based garage rock band The Novas wrote a song dedicated to him called "The Crusher", with lead singer Bob Nolan imitating the raunchy voice of Crusher Lisowski (and his trademark yell at the beginning of the record). The tune, which included the lyrics "Do the hammer lock, you turkeynecks!" was popular in the upper Midwest and made it to #88 on the national Billboard chart. It was later covered by The Cramps on their album Psychedelic Jungle, and has long been a staple on the Dr. Demento Radio Show. The song has received a resurgence of popularity in recent years, as David Letterman has often played it on his late-night talk show. The Ramones released a song entitled "The Crusher", paying tribute to Lisowski on their last studio recorded album, Adios Amigos.

On June 8, 2019, a bronze statue of The Crusher was unveiled in South Milwaukee at 1101 Milwaukee Avenue. South Milwaukee Mayor Erik Brooks declared the day "Reggie 'Da Crusher' Lisowski Day" in his memory. A few weeks later on August 24, 2019, surveillance video captured two men striking the statue with a concrete block, damaging the nose, cheek and chest. Da Crusher's family noticed the damage and reported it to police. It was later revealed those who vandalized the statue were 18-year-old James Dudgeon, who was charged with criminal damage to property, and 21-year-old Douglas E. Macklin, who was also charged with criminal damage to property.

Championships and accomplishments 
Capitol Wrestling Corporation
NWA United States Television Championship (1 time) 
 Cauliflower Alley Club
 Other honoree (2000)
 Fred Kohler Enterprises
 NWA World Tag Team Championship (Chicago version) (3 times) - with Art Neilson (1) and Stan Lisowski (2)
 Georgia Championship Wrestling
 NWA Georgia Tag Team Championship (1 time) - with Tommy Rich
 Japan Wrestling Association
 NWA International Tag Team Championship (1 time) - with Dick the Bruiser
 Maple Leaf Wrestling
 NWA Canadian Open Tag Team Championship (1 time) - with Stan Lisowski
 NWA Minneapolis Wrestling and Boxing Club/American Wrestling Association
 AWA Brass Knuckles Championship (1 time)
 AWA World Heavyweight Championship (3 times)
 AWA World Tag Team Championship (9 times) - with Dick the Bruiser (5), Verne Gagne (1), Red Bastien (1), Billy Robinson (1) and Baron von Raschke (1)
 NWA World Tag Team Championship (Minneapolis version) (2 times) - with Stan Lisowski
 British Open Tag Team Championship (Minneapolis version) (1 time) - with Stan Lisowski
 World Heavyweight Championship (Omaha version) (1 time)
 Nebraska Heavyweight Championship (1 time)
 Pro Wrestling Illustrated
 PWI Tag Team of the Year (1972) - with Dick the Bruiser
 Ranked No. 260 of the 500 best singles wrestlers of the PWI Years in 2003
 Professional Wrestling Hall of Fame
 (Class of 2005) - with Bruiser
 Western States Sports
 NWA World Tag Team Championship (Amarillo version) (1 time) - with Art Nelson
 World Championship Wrestling
 WCW Hall of Fame (Class of 1994)
 World Wrestling Association
 WWA World Tag Team Championship (6 times) - with Dick the Bruiser
 Wrestling Observer Newsletter
 Worst Tag Team (1984) with Baron Von Raschke
 Wrestling Observer Newsletter Hall of Fame (Class of 1996)
 Other
 Rocky Mountain Heavyweight Championship (1 time)

References

External links 
 Cauliflower Alley Club - list of honorees
 Pro Wrestling HOF: The Crusher & The Bruiser
 SLAM! Sports: The Crusher dead at 79
 
 

1926 births
2005 deaths
American male professional wrestlers
AWA World Heavyweight Champions
Sportspeople from Milwaukee
Professional wrestlers from Wisconsin
Professional Wrestling Hall of Fame and Museum
People from South Milwaukee, Wisconsin
Stampede Wrestling alumni
Deaths from brain cancer in the United States
United States Army soldiers
20th-century professional wrestlers
AWA World Tag Team Champions
NWA Canadian Open Tag Team Champions
NWA International Tag Team Champions